The Terliczka gas field in Poland was discovered in 1989. It began production of natural gas in 1992. The total proven reserves of the Terliczka gas field are around 35 billion cubic feet (1×109m³).

References

Natural gas fields in Poland